Svengali is a 1983 American television film based on the 1894 novel Trilby by George du Maurier.

Cast 
 Peter O'Toole - Anton Bosnyak
 Jodie Foster - Zoe Alexander
 Elizabeth Ashley - Eve Swiss
 Larry Joshua - Johnny Rainbow
 Pamela Blair - Trish
 Barbara Bryne - Mrs. Burns-Rizzo
 Ron Weyand - Hypnotist
 Robin Thomas - Mendy Weindenbaum
 Brian Carney - Abbot Renfrew
 Madeleine Potter - Antonia
 Holly Hunter - Leslie
 Vera Mayer - Gizella
 Stuart Charno - Boomer

Production
Filming took place over 20 days. Shortly after filming, director Anthony Harvey had a near-fatal car crash. "I hadn't been in hospital but a week," he says, "when CBS started cutting the movie, seriously harming it. All the more fragile moments are gone and so are the exterior scenes that opened up the story."

References

External links 

1983 television films
1983 films
American television films
Trilby (novel)